The men's 110 metres hurdles event at the 2013 Asian Athletics Championships was held at the Shree Shiv Chhatrapati Sports Complex. The final took place on 5 July.

Medalists

Results

Heats
First 2 in each heat (Q) and 2 best performers (q) advanced to the semifinals.

Wind: Heat 1: +0.3 m/s, Heat 2: -0.4 m/s, Heat 3: +0.5 m/s

Final
Wind: +0.1 m/s

References
Results

110 Men's
Sprint hurdles at the Asian Athletics Championships